The 1888 Belmont Stakes was the 22nd running of the Belmont Stakes and the 22nd time it was held at Jerome Park Racetrack in The Bronx, New York where it had been first run in 1867. It was run on June 9, 1888. The race drew only two starters who both carried 118 pounds. It was won by heavily favored Sir Dixon whose winning time was 2:40¼ over a distance of 1½ miles on a dirt track rated fast.

Jockey Jim McLaughlin aboard Sir Dixon won his sixth Belmont Stakes, a record that still stands , and one that has been equaled only by Eddie Arcaro in 1955.

Results

 Winning Breeder: Ezekiel F. Clay & Catesby Woodford breeding partnership (KY)

References

External links 
 

Jerome Park Racetrack
Belmont Stakes races
Belmont Stakes
Belmont Stakes
Belmont Stakes
Jerome Park, Bronx
Horse races in New York City